Quesnoy-le-Montant is a former railway station located in the hamlet of Saint-Sulpice, in the commune of Quesnoy-le-Montant in the Somme department, France. The station was served by TER Hauts-de-France trains from Le Tréport-Mers to Abbeville (line 25).

Location
The line is at km 186.636 on the Abbeville–Eu railway between Abbeville and Acheux-Franleu.  Four old stations between the station and Abbeville are now closed: Faubourg-de-Rouvroy, Cambron-Laviers, Gouy-Cahon and Cahon.

History
The line from Paris to Le Tréport via Amiens and Abbeville was first opened in 1873. The station underwent renovations in 2008. Train services were discontinued in 2018.

See also
List of SNCF stations in Hauts-de-France

References

External links
 Ter Picardie SNCF
 Gares Picardie (the region's official website)

Railway stations in France opened in 1873
Defunct railway stations in Somme (department)